Rákosszentmihályi Atlétikai és Football Club is a professional football club based in Rákosszentmihály, Budapest, Hungary, that competes in the Nemzeti Bajnokság III, the third tier of Hungarian football.

History
Rákosszentmihályi AFC reached the 6th round of the 2017–18 Magyar Kupa.

Name changes
1913–1920: Rákosszentmihályi AFC
1920: merger with a Rákosszentmihályi SC-vel, Rákosszentmihályi TK néven
1924: reestablished
1929: merger with Corvin Sashalmi TC
1924–1936: Rákosszentmihályi AFC
1936: merger with MOVE
1936–1941: MOVE Rákosszentmihályi Athletikai és Football Club
1941–1945: MOVE Rákosszentmihályi Társadalmi és Sport Egyesület
 1945–present: Rákosszentmihályi Atlétikai és Fotball Club

Current squad

Managers

External links
 Profile on Magyar Futball

References

Football clubs in Hungary
Association football clubs established in 1913
1913 establishments in Hungary